The 2015–16 season was Hellas Verona Football Club's third consecutive season in Serie A. The club endured an awful league season, failing to win a game until after the halfway point of the season and finishing 20th. Meanwhile, the club fared little better in the Coppa Italia, being eliminated by Napoli in the Round of 16.

Players

Squad information

Transfers

In

Loans in

Competitions

Serie A

League table

Results summary

Results by round

Matches

Coppa Italia

Statistics

Appearances and goals

|-
! colspan="14" style="background:#dcdcdc; text-align:center"| Goalkeepers

|-
! colspan="14" style="background:#dcdcdc; text-align:center"| Defenders

|-
! colspan="14" style="background:#dcdcdc; text-align:center"| Midfielders

|-
! colspan="14" style="background:#dcdcdc; text-align:center"| Forwards

|-
! colspan="14" style="background:#dcdcdc; text-align:center"| Players transferred out during the season

Goalscorers

Last updated: 15 May 2016

Clean sheets
Last updated: 4 April 2016

References

Hellas Verona F.C. seasons
Hellas Verona